Twin Bridges is a town in Madison County, Montana, United States. It lies at the confluence of the Ruby, Beaverhead and Big Hole Rivers which form the Jefferson River. Twin Bridges is a well-known fly fishing mecca for trout anglers. The population was 330 at the 2020 census.

History

Four Indian trails came together at a bend of the Beaverhead River north of the present school building in Twin Bridges. These trails were used by early settlers and freight companies, and helped to establish where the community of Twin Bridges would develop. Judge M.H. Lott came to Montana in 1862, and with his brother John T. Lott, settled in the Ruby Valley in 1864. In 1865 they built a bridge across the Beaverhead River, and later built another bridge across the Beaverhead at the Point of Rocks. The Lott brothers continued development of roads and promoted settlement of the town, which was incorporated in 1902, with M.H. Lott as the first mayor.

Geography

Climate
According to the Köppen Climate Classification system, Twin Bridges has a semi-arid climate, abbreviated "BSk" on climate maps.

Demographics

2010 census
As of the census of 2010, there were 375 people, 172 households, and 94 families living in the town. The racial makeup of the town was 96.0% White, 0.5% African American, 0.5% Native American, 0.8% from other races, and 2.1% from two or more races. Hispanic or Latino of any race were 2.9% of the population.

There were 172 households, of which 25.0% had children under the age of 18 living with them, 42.4% were married couples living together, 7.0% had a female householder with no husband present, 5.2% had a male householder with no wife present, and 45.3% were non-families. 37.2% of all households were made up of individuals, and 18% had someone living alone who was 65 years of age or older. The average household size was 2.18 and the average family size was 2.91.

The median age in the town was 44.6 years. 22.7% of residents were under the age of 18; 5.1% were between the ages of 18 and 24; 22.6% were from 25 to 44; 30.7% were from 45 to 64; and 18.9% were 65 years of age or older. The gender makeup of the town was 54.7% male and 45.3% female.

2000 census
As of the census of 2000, there were 400 people, 175 households, and 105 families living in the town. The population density was 419.5 people per square mile (162.6/km2). There were 216 housing units at an average density of 226.5 per square mile (87.8/km2). The racial makeup of the town was 97.75% White, 0.25% Asian, and 2.00% from two or more races. Hispanic or Latino of any race were 0.50% of the population.

There were 175 households, out of which 25.7% had children under the age of 18 living with them, 50.3% were married couples living together, 6.9% had a female householder with no husband present, and 40.0% were non-families. 34.9% of all households were made up of individuals, and 13.7% had someone living alone who was 65 years of age or older. The average household size was 2.29 and the average family size was 2.95.

In the town, the population was spread out, with 25.3% under the age of 18, 4.3% from 18 to 24, 24.8% from 25 to 44, 28.0% from 45 to 64, and 17.8% who were 65 years of age or older. The median age was 42 years. For every 100 females there were 92.3 males. For every 100 females age 18 and over, there were 94.2 males.

The median income for a household in the town was $25,833, and the median income for a family was $34,688. Males had a median income of $25,417 versus $16,250 for females. The per capita income for the town was $13,171. About 6.2% of families and 8.5% of the population were below the poverty line, including 4.4% of those under age 18 and 10.6% of those age 65 or over.

Economy 
Twin Bridges serves as a tourist destination for both fly fishers and cyclists. The town sits on two long-distance cycling trails - the TransAmerica Trail, and the Lewis & Clark Bicycle Trail. In 2009, a "bike camp" was built in the town, and local stores started stocking basic cycling supplies.

Infrastructure
Twin Bridges Airport is a public use airport located two miles (4 km) southeast of town.

Montana Highway 287 and Montana Highway 41 intersect in town.

Education
Twin Bridges Public Schools educate students from kindergarten through 12th grade. The Twin Bridges Public Library serves the area.

Notable people
Angela McLean, lieutenant governor of Montana
Benny Reynolds, rodeo champion
Donald Rumsfeld, American political figure and businessman
Spokane, winner of the 1889 Kentucky Derby
Kenneth Walsh, member of the Montana House of Representatives

See also 
 The Round Barn at Twin Bridges, once described as a "swank hotel for horses," is on the National Register of Historic Places.

Gallery

Notes

External links
 Greater Ruby Valley Chamber of Commerce

Towns in Madison County, Montana
1902 establishments in Montana